Long is an unincorporated community in Columbia County, in the U.S. state of Washington. An early variant name was Milton Mills.

References

Unincorporated communities in Columbia County, Washington
Unincorporated communities in Washington (state)